is a Japanese company headquartered in Tokyo, established in 1939. The company's business is manufacturing and sales of clinical diagnostics and equipment.

Eiken's major products include fecal immunochemical test reagents, immunological and serological reagents, microbiological reagents, urinalysis test strips, clinical chemistry reagents, molecular genetics, medical devices and industrial products.

The company in 1998 developed the Loop-mediated isothermal amplification (LAMP) method, a nucleic acid amplification method, which is one of the most valuable tools in virtually all life science fields.

References

External links

 Eiken Chemical website 

Health care companies of Japan
Biotechnology companies of Japan
Companies based in Tokyo
Companies listed on the Tokyo Stock Exchange
Chemical companies established in 1939
Japanese companies established in 1939
Japanese brands